Winter in a Silver Box is an EP by the American alternative rock band The Autumns, released in 1998.  It had a limited pressing of 1,000 copies, and has been long out of print.

Track listing
"The Angel Pool" (remix)
"Tears and the Sun"
"Pale Trembles a Gale" (remix)
"Winter in a Silver Box"

External links

The Autumns albums
1998 EPs